Tainaron: Mail From Another City (orig. Fin. ) is a science fiction/fantasy novel written in 1985 by Finnish author Leena Krohn. The book is regarded as the author's breakthrough novel. Tainaron was nominated for the Finlandia Prize in 1985, The Nordic Council Literature Prize in 1988, the World Fantasy Award and the International Horror Guild Award in 2005. It won the Thanks for the Book Award in 1986.

Tainaron consists of 30 letters sent beyond the sea from a city of insects.

The U.S. edition was nominated for the World Fantasy Award and the International Horror Guild Award in 2005. This edition, published by Prime Books in 2004 and edited by Kathleen Martin, adds to the original Finnish publication by adding original illustrations by the author's sister, Inari Krohn, a Finnish painter.

Reviewed in glowing terms by Matthew Cheney, the writing was described as "lyrical and deep, metaphysical, philosophical, poetic". Jeff VanderMeer praised its "scenes of startling beauty and strangeness" and listed it as one of the best novels of 2004.

Translations
 English (2004): Tainaron: Mail from Another City, translator Hilda Hawkins, publisher Prime Books. 
 Estonian (1994): , translator Ele Süvalep, publisher Aniara Kirjastus
 Hungarian (1992): Tainaron, translator Csilla Varga, publisher Európa. Part of the compilation 
 Japanese (2002): , translator Hiroko Suenobu, publisher Shinhyoron Publishing
 Latvian (1998): , translator Ingrida Peldekse, publisher Preses nams
 Polish (2008): , translator Sebastian Musielak, publisher Świat Książki. 
Spanish (2017): , translator Luisa Gutiérrez Ruiz, publisher Nórdica Libros. 
 Swedish (1987): , translator Thomas Warburton, publisher Fripress Bokförlag.

References

External links 
 Author's website

 Tainaron available online in multiple formats
 Author Interview after US Publication

1985 novels
20th-century Finnish novels
1985 science fiction novels
Epistolary novels
Finnish science fiction novels